Eldad may refer to:

 Eldad and Medad, two Biblical figures mentioned in the Book of Numbers
 Kfar Eldad, an Israeli Communal settlement in the Gush Etzion Regional Council 
 Maccabi Neve Sha'anan Eldad F.C., an Israeli football club

All later Eldads are directly or indirectly named for the Biblical one

Eldad Amir (born 1961), Israeli Olympic competitive sailor
 Eldad ha-Dani, ninth-century merchant and traveler
 Eldad Ginossar (born 1981), a professional bridge player
 Eldad Regev (1980, Qiryat Motzkin - 2006), Israeli soldier
Eldad Ronen (born 1976), Israeli Olympic competitive sailor
 Eldad Tarmu (1960, Los Angeles, California), vibraphonist and composer
 Eldad Tsabary, composer of electroacoustic music
 Aryeh Eldad, member of the Israeli Knesset, son of Israel Eldad
 Israel Eldad, Revisionist Zionist philosopher and a leader of the Lehi underground
 Rafael Eldad (born 1949, Casablanca), Israeli diplomat

Hebrew-language given names
Hebrew-language surnames